The 2007 Gaz de France Budapest Grand Prix was a WTA Tour women's tennis event held on outdoor clay courts in Budapest, Hungary from 21 April until 29 April 2007. It was the 13th edition of the tournament.The singles title was won by Gisela Dulko. 

Both Dulko and Cîrstea were playing in their first final on the WTA Tour, with Dulko coming through in 3 sets.

Finals

Singles

 Gisela Dulko defeated Sorana Cîrstea 6–7(2–7), 6–2, 6–2

Doubles

 Ágnes Szávay /  Vladimíra Uhlířová defeated  Martina Müller /  Gabriela Navrátilová 7–5, 6–2

External links
 WTA draws

Budapest Grand Prix
Budapest Grand Prix
Buda
Buda